is a Japanese autobiographical manga written and illustrated by Chii. It was published in a single volume in February 2016.

Plot
The autobiography follows Chii as she navigates love, sexuality, and gender as a trans woman. She recounts her relationship with her boyfriend and eventual husband, and explains how she physically and legally transitioned.

Publication
The manga was written and illustrated by Chii. It was published in a single tankōbon volume by Asukashinsha on February 9, 2016.

In November 2017, Seven Seas Entertainment announced they licensed the series for English publication. They released the volume on May 8, 2018.

Reception
As part of Anime News Network's spring 2018 manga guide, Amy McNulty, Lynzee Loveridge, and Rebecca Silverman reviewed the volume for the website. All three critics praised the story and art as "heartwarming". The reviewer for Publishers Weekly had similar thoughts about the volume, praising the art and emotion in the plot. Johanna from Comics Worth Reading also praised the volume for being both educational and entertaining. Jason Thompson from Otaku USA recommended the series for similar reasons as other critics, praising the plot and artwork. Sean Gaffney from A Case Suitable for Treatment concurred with Johanna, praising the volume as fun and educational. Melina Dargis from The Fandom Post concurred with previous critics, praising the volume as "touching".

In 2019, the volume ranked on the Young Adult Library Services Association's list of the best graphic novels for teens.

References

External links
 

2016 manga
Japanese memoirs
Literary memoirs
Romantic comedy anime and manga
Seven Seas Entertainment titles
Transgender in anime and manga
2010s LGBT literature